Martin Cronin (born 1975 in Cork, Ireland) is an Irish sportsperson.  He plays Gaelic football with his local club Nemo Rangers and was a member of the Cork senior inter-county team from the 1990s until the 2000s.

References

 

1975 births
Living people
Nemo Rangers Gaelic footballers
Cork inter-county Gaelic footballers
Munster inter-provincial Gaelic footballers
Date of birth missing (living people)